Tim Turner (7 September 1924 – 1987) was an English actor who performed during the 1950s and 1960s.

Life and career
He was born John Freeman Turner in Bexley, Kent. Before becoming a film and television actor, Turner was a popular leading young man in the theatre. One of his roles was as the love interest of Stella Linden's Sadie Thompson in the 1949 tour of Rain, adapted from the short story by W. Somerset Maugham.

Uncredited, Turner provided the voice of the title character in the TV series The Invisible Man (1958–59), a loose adaptation of the 1897 novel by H.G. Wells. He appeared in person in one episode as a foreign-accented villain. Later, Turner dubbed the voice of actor Todd Armstrong for the 1963 film Jason and the Argonauts.

Between 1959 and 1963, Turner narrated most of the Look at Life series of short documentary films produced by the Rank Organisation.

He was married to actress Patricia Plunkett from 1951 until her death in 1974. He later married in Gibraltar to Mercia Dunkley. Turner died in Spain in 1987.

Filmography

References

External links

1924 births
1987 deaths
20th-century English male actors
Male actors from Kent
Deaths in Spain
English male film actors
English male stage actors
English male television actors
English male voice actors
People from Bexley
Date of death missing
Place of death missing
English expatriates in Spain